This article details the 1996 season of Sanfrecce Hiroshima.

Review and events

League results summary

League results by round

Competitions

Domestic results

J.League

Emperor's Cup

J.League Cup

Player statistics

 † player(s) joined the team after the opening of this season.

Transfers

In:

Out:

Transfers during the season

In
 Santos (from Veracruz on June)
 Minoru Ueda
 Tetsuharu Yamaguchi (from Isahaya Commercial High School)
 Shoji Akimitsu
 Kazuyoshi Matsunaga (from Nakatsu Kogyo High School)

Out
 Hideaki Mori (to Avispa Fukuoka)

Awards

none

References

Other pages
 J. League official site
 Sanfrecce Hiroshima official site

Sanfrecce Hiroshima
Sanfrecce Hiroshima seasons